Lake Worth is located on the West Fork of the Trinity River. It is entirely inside the city limits of Fort Worth, Texas, United States.

History and development

Lake Worth was built in 1914 as a reservoir and for recreation. The property is owned by the City of Fort Worth, while the Tarrant Regional Water District controls the reservoir's water rights. The lake has a moderate fluctuation with stained clarity. Submerged vegetation is sparse. There are shallow flats covered with cattails and other emergent species.

When first impounded, Lake Worth provided boating and recreation that drew people from throughout the North Texas area.  Over time, the lake became more neglected, but the expansion of Fort Worth has recently brought the lake and its parks new popularity.

Since the early 1960s, many calls were made for dredging the lake and restoring its recreational potential, but city leaders were either unwilling or unable to fund the expensive proposition.  This funding problem ended in the mid-2000s, when it became technologically feasible to access natural gas of the Barnett Shale, which partially lies underneath the lake.

A movement of Fort Worth citizens has pushed for retaining a portion of that gas revenue windfall for renovating and developing its public recreational potential.  This movement proposes to make improvements such as dredging the lake, setting aside  of additional city-owned land as green space, building trails and other recreational infrastructure, and integrating the overall area into a "world-class" park such as New York's Central Park (the city currently operates a  park on the lake's northern end as the Fort Worth Nature Center and Refuge. A capital improvement plan and vision plan have been developed to address development of Lake Worth and surrounding property.

Mythology
Lake Worth is considered the site of one of the best documented cryptozoology sightings. In July 1969, a large creature was sighted by numerous people over several days. The creature was described as part goat, part fish, part man. The locals refer to the animal as the "Lake Worth monster" or the "Lake Worth Goatman".

See also
 Trinity River Authority

Videos
 Lake Worth: Polishing a Tarnished Jewel, Star Telegram Video - January 18, 2008
Saving Lake Worth, Star Telegram Video, January 6, 2008
December 11th 2007 Fort Worth Council Meeting to Dredge Lake Worth - Channel 11 News Reporting
December 11, 2007 Fort Worth Council Meeting to Dredge Lake Worth - Channel 8 News Reporting
August 2007 Barnett Shale Revenue Committee Meeting to Dredge Lake Worth - Channel 11 News Reporting

References

External links
Texas Parks and Wildlife
Dredging Lake Worth FAQ's
Scenic Shores Neighborhood Association

Reservoirs in Texas
Trinity River (Texas)
Geography of Fort Worth, Texas
Bodies of water of Tarrant County, Texas
Protected areas of Tarrant County, Texas
1914 establishments in Texas
Fort Worth, Texas